Max Johann Leuthe (25 August 1879 – 2 December 1945) was an Austrian footballer. He played in two matches for the Austria national football team from 1903 to 1905.

References

External links
 

1879 births
1945 deaths
Austrian footballers
Austria international footballers
Association footballers not categorized by position
Footballers from Vienna
First Vienna FC players
Wiener AC players